Jeremy Childs is an American actor and writer from Nashville, Tennessee.

Biography
Childs gained wide recognition as prisoner Cutbush, in the 2001 movie The Last Castle alongside Robert Redford and James Gandolfini.  He featured prominently in the 2012 mystery drama film Deadline.

Childs produced and starred in the horror film Closer To God where he played a genetic scientist and garnered much critical praise.

Childs was featured prominently in the film Country Strong with Tim McGraw and Gwyneth Paltrow.

He is brother to actor Josh Childs, with whom he appeared in the films Prism, and Netherbeast Incorporated.

Childs wrote and has performed in the comedy play Vampire Monologues, which played to a full house in Nashville on Halloween 2002 and 2004. Childs has also had considerable roles in various local and regional stage productions.

He appeared in the music video for "Hear Me Now" by Framing Hanley playing the priest as well as in the music video for "Unbreakable" by the band Fireflight.

He also played the role of Albert in the television series Nashville.

Childs played the role of Jody in Season 3 of AMC's Preacher (TV series).

References

External links

Year of birth missing (living people)
Living people
American male stage actors
People from Nashville, Tennessee
Male actors from Tennessee